The John D. Dingell Jr. Conservation, Management, and Recreation Act of 2019 is an omnibus lands act that protected public lands and modified management provisions. Other provisions included making the Land and Water Conservation Fund permanent, protecting a number of rivers and historic sites, and withdrawing land near Yellowstone National Park and North Cascades National Park from mining.

Passage of the bill was hailed as a rare bipartisan environmental victory.

Legislative history

The last major bill passed regarding public lands was the Omnibus Public Land Management Act of 2009. Since then many bills had been introduced but never passed; the Act incorporates more than 100 pieces of legislation, collectively introduced by some 50 senators and a range of representatives.

S. 47, initially the Natural Resources Management Act, was sponsored by Senators Lisa Murkowski of Alaska and Maria Cantwell of Washington, the chair and former ranking member of the Committee on Energy and Natural Resources. The Senate voted for the bill 92–8 on February 12, 2019, and the House of Representatives passed it 363–62 on February 26. President Donald Trump signed it into law on March 12, 2019, as P.L. 116-9.

Following initial passage, an addendum named the bill for John Dingell, Jr. to honor the recently deceased former Congressperson who had sponsored multiple landmark conservation laws during his lengthy tenure, and was known as being an avid outdoorsman and conservationist.

The Congressional Budget Office estimated the bill would save $9 million in direct spending over 10 years and would generate substantial additional revenue.

Provisions
The law is divided into nine titles, each containing a number of provisions. Selected major provisions are listed.

Title I

Subtitle A 
Subtitle A authorizes land exchanges with and conveyances to local governments and private landowners.

  added to Arapaho National Forest

Subtitle B 
Subtitle B addresses management of public lands and the National Forest System.

 Authorizes Saint Francis Dam Disaster National Memorial and establishes Saint Francis Dam Disaster National Monument in California
 Establishes the John Wesley Powell National Conservation Area in Utah
Designates  as Ah-shi-sle-pah Wilderness in New Mexico

Subtitle C 

 In Organ Mountains–Desert Peaks National Monument, New Mexico:
  as Aden Lava Flow Wilderness
  as Broad Canyon Wilderness
  as Cinder Cone Wilderness
  as East Potrillo Mountains Wilderness
  as Mount Riley Wilderness
  as Organ Mountains Wilderness
  as Potrillo Mountains Wilderness
  as Robledo Mountains Wilderness
  as Sierra de las Uvas Wilderness
  as Whitethorn Wilderness
 In Rio Grande del Norte National Monument, New Mexico:
  as Cerro del Yuta Wilderness
  as Río San Antonio Wilderness
  of the Methow Valley, in Okanogan–Wenatchee National Forest, Washington, is withdrawn from mining use
 Emigrant Crevice, in Gallatin National Forest, Montana, is withdrawn from mining use
San Rafael Swell Recreation Area is established in Utah
 Segments of the Rogue River, Franklin Creek, Wasson Creek, Molalla River, and Elk River, Oregon, are added to the National Wild and Scenic Rivers System (280 miles)
 Designates  as Devil's Staircase Wilderness in Oregon

 In Utah:
  as Big Wild Horse Mesa Wilderness
  as Cold Wash Wilderness
  as Desolation Canyon Wilderness
  as Devil's Canyon Wilderness
  as Eagle Canyon Wilderness
  as Horse Valley Wilderness
  as Labyrinth Canyon Wilderness
  as Little Ocean Draw Wilderness
  as Little Wild Horse Canyon Wilderness
  as Lower Last Chance Wilderness
  as Mexican Mountain Wilderness
  as Middle Wild Horse Mesa Wilderness
  as Muddy Creek Wilderness
  as Nelson Mountain Wilderness
  as Red's Canyon Wilderness
  as San Rafael Reef Wilderness
  as Sid's Mountain Wilderness
  as Turtle Canyon Wilderness
 The Green River is added to the National Wild and Scenic Rivers System
Jurassic National Monument is established in Utah, managed by the Bureau of Land Management
 Rivers in Connecticut, Rhode Island, Massachusetts, and New Hampshire are added to the National Wild and Scenic Rivers System (225 miles)
 In California:
  as Avawatz Mountains Wilderness
  as Great Falls Basin Wilderness
  as Soda Mountains Wilderness
  as Milpitas Wash Wildernes
  as Buzzards Peak Wilderness
  added to Golden Valley Wilderness
  added to Kingston Range Wilderness
  added to Palo Verde Mountains Wilderness
  added to Indian Pass Mountains Wilderness
  added to Death Valley National Park Wilderness
  added to San Gorgonio Wilderness (San Bernardino National Forest)
  are added to Death Valley National Park
  are added to Joshua Tree National Park
 Alabama Hills National Scenic Area is established in California

Title II

Subtitle A 

Subtitle A calls for special resource studies of the President James K. Polk Home & Museum in Tennessee, the Thurgood Marshall School in Maryland, President Street Station in Maryland, Granada War Relocation Center in Colorado, and the George W. Bush Childhood Home in Texas for consideration of inclusion in the National Park System.

Subtitle B 
Subtitle B adjusts the boundaries of:

 Shiloh National Military Park, also creating Parker's Crossroads Battlefield as an affiliated area
 Ocmulgee Mounds National Historical Park, renamed from Ocmulgee National Monument
 Kennesaw Mountain National Battlefield Park
 Fort Frederica National Monument, adding 
 Fort Scott National Historic Site
 Florissant Fossil Beds National Monument, adding 
 Voyageurs National Park
 Acadia National Park, adding 
 Home of Franklin D. Roosevelt National Historic Site, adding

Subtitle C 
Subtitle C redesignates several NPS areas:

 Saint-Gaudens National Historic Site as Saint-Gaudens National Historical Park
 Names Robert Emmet Park
 Fort Sumter National Monument as Fort Sumter and Fort Moultrie National Historical Park
 Reconstruction Era National Monument as Reconstruction Era National Historical Park
 Golden Spike National Historic Site as Golden Spike National Historical Park
 World War II Valor in the Pacific National Monument is divided into Pearl Harbor National Memorial, Aleutian Islands World War II National Monument (FWS), and Tule Lake National Monument
 Honouliuli National Monument as Honouliuli National Historic Site

Subtitle D 
Subtitle D establishes new units of the National Park System:

 Medgar and Myrlie Evers Home National Monument, Mississippi
 Mill Springs Battlefield National Monument, Kentucky
 Camp Nelson Heritage National Monument, Kentucky (renamed from Camp Nelson National Monument as designated by presidential proclamation)

Subtitle E 
Subtitle E amends miscellaneous management provisions.

 The Historically Black Colleges and Universities Historic Preservation Program is reauthorized.
 A commission is established to plan the Adams Memorial.

Subtitle F 
Subtitle F relates to the National Trails System.
Extends the North Country National Scenic Trail into Vermont
Extends the Lewis and Clark National Historic Trail to Pennsylvania, Ohio, West Virginia, Kentucky, and Indiana
Authorizes a study of the route of Zebulon Pike's Pike Expedition as Pike National Historic Trail

Title III 
Title III reauthorizes the Land and Water Conservation Fund indefinitely. At least 40% of the funds, derived from offshore drilling royalties, are to be used for federal lands, and at least 40% are allocated to the states.

Title IV 
Title IV states that public land managed by the Forest Service or Bureau of Land Management is open to hunting, fishing, and shooting, unless closed under certain procedures.

Title V 
Title V establishes a National Volcano Early Warning and Monitoring System under the United States Geological Survey and reauthorizes the National Geologic Mapping Act of 1992.

Title VI 
Title VI designates new National Heritage Areas:

 Appalachian Forest National Heritage Area, Maryland and West Virginia
 Maritime Washington National Heritage Area, Washington
 Mountains to Sound Greenway National Heritage Area, Washington
 Sacramento-San Joaquin Delta National Heritage Area, California
 Santa Cruz Valley National Heritage Area, Arizona
 Susquehanna National Heritage Area, Pennsylvania
It also lays out procedures for planning and management of national heritage areas.

Title VII 
Title VII concerns wildlife management.

Title VIII 
Title VIII concerns water and power and the Bureau of Reclamation. Among its provisions, it reauthorizes the Yakima River Basin Water Enhancement Project, with the purpose of promoting water conservation, water supply, habitat, and stream enhancement improvements in the Yakima River basin.

Title IX 
Title IX has miscellaneous provisions:

 Extends the Every Kid in a Park program for 7 years – allows free admission for fourth grade students and their families to federal lands (Every Kid Outdoors Act)
Expedites access to public lands and waives insurance requirements for search and rescue volunteers (Good Samaritan Search and Recovery Act)
Allows Public Land Corps programs for youth and veterans to partner with more federal agencies on conservation and restoration projects (21st Century Conservation Service Corps Act)
 Designates the Nordic Museum in Seattle, Washington, as the National Nordic Museum (National Nordic Museum Act)
 Designates the George C. Marshall Museum and Research Library in Lexington, Virginia, as the National George C. Marshall Museum and Library
 Updates federal law to use modern terminology in reference to minority groups (21st Century Respect Act)
 Permits the designation of American World War II Heritage Cities to recognize preservation of World War II home-front history
 Designates the Quindaro Townsite National Commemorative Site
 Designates the National Comedy Center in Jamestown, New York.

Title XIII 
Title XIII pertains to Off-Highway Vehicle Recreation Areas:
 Designates the Dumont Dunes Off-Highway Vehicle Recreation Area
 Designates the El Mirage Off-Highway Vehicle Area
 Designates the Rasor Off-Highway Vehicle Area
 Designates the Spangler Hills Off-Highway Vehicle Recreation Area
 Designates the Stoddard Valley Off-Highway Vehicle Recreation Area
 Expands the Johnson Valley Off-Highway Vehicle Recreation Area

Notes

References

External links 

 Full text of the bill from Congress.gov
 Position on S. 47, Natural Resources Management Act from the National Parks Conservation Association

Acts of the 116th United States Congress
United States federal public land legislation